V Factory was an American pop/R&B/urban boy band produced by late former pop artist Tommy Page. The members have yet to confirm what the "V" stands for. Wesley Quinn, in an interview with Popstar! Magazine, stated that "the V is a hidden meaning between the five of us." He also states that the meaning will come out like the FedEx box in the movie, Cast Away, which stars Tom Hanks.

History

Musical career 
On April 29, 2008, (in the US only) These Are The Days EP was released on iTunes, including "Round and Round", "She Bad" (featuring E-40), and the namesake, "These Are the Days", also available for purchase at any of their shows. On January 12, 2009, it was released in the UK and other countries.

Bandemonium 2008
V Factory performed at the Bandemonium Tour alongside Menudo, Mark and James, and NLT. The tour ran from May 1, 2008 to May 26, 2008.

Rise to fame
V Factory's first single, "Love Struck", was released to iTunes on February 3, 2009. It played recurringly on Radio Disney, premiering on Music Mailbag. Its peak on mainstream radio was #37 and #70 on the Pop 100. The song is produced by Swedish production team twin and is written by David Jassy and Darin. "Love Struck" was released on iTunes in the UK and other countries on 9 September .

The "Love Struck" music video was released officially on May 22, 2009 on AOL Music.

Members
Current members
 Jared Murillo (born August 6, 1988) from Honolulu, Hawaii. He is most known for being Ashley Tisdale's ex-boyfriend. Murillo is known for his appearances as a featured dancer in High School Musical, its nationwide tour, and High School Musical 2, for which he also earned an Assistant Choreographer credit by creating the dance number for "I Don't Dance". He was also the dance partner of Lacey Schwimmer. He was one of the professional dancers in the UK's Strictly Come Dancing (2010).
 Nick "Nicky T" Teti (born July 22, 1983) from Philadelphia, Pennsylvania. Teti got his start doing musical theater in high school. Subsequently, Teti taught himself dance in college. He was a member of the dance crew Quest Crew.
 Nathaniel Flatt (born September 18, 1981) from Cookeville, Tennessee. Flatt launched his acting career in local plays and eventually found his way into musical theater, including a stage production of Disney's Aladdin at Disney California Adventure.

Past members

 Asher Monroe (born September 18, 1988) from Arlington, Virginia. Monroe was the lead singer, but in October 2010 he wrote on his official Twitter: "I love you sooo much vfactory fans! U have been amazing but I'm no longer with the group! It's been a ride and yes we are all still friends!".
 Wesley Quinn (born January 16, 1990) from Greenville, South Carolina. He began performing at age 6 after attending his younger sister’s dance recital. He was a backup dancer for Ashley Tisdale with fellow V factory member, Jared Murillo. Wesley has performed numerous times as a background dancer in the FOX show Glee.

Discography

Extended plays
 2008: These Are the Days
Track listing
"Round & Round"
"She Bad" (featuring E-40)
"These Are the Days"

Singles

Other songs
 "Get Up (2nd Single)"
 "Lights Camera Action"
 "Fade"
 "Dem Hot Gurlz"
 "In It for the Love"
 "Doin' It Too"
 "Beautiful Girl"
 "History"
 "Pump It"

Awards and nominations
In 2009, V Factory was nominated for StarShine Magazine Music Awards for "Favorite Band/Group". Their debut single "Love Struck" was nominated for "Best Dance Song" in the same awards.

References

External links 
 Official YouTube Channel

American musical trios
American contemporary R&B musical groups
American pop music groups
American boy bands
Musical groups established in 2006
Warner Records artists